British Tunisians are citizens or residents of the United Kingdom that are of Tunisian ancestry. British-Tunisians may also include children born in the United Kingdom to a British (or of any other origin) parent and a Tunisian parent.

Demographics 

The 2011 UK Census recorded 5,715 Tunisian-born residents in England, 117 in Wales, 267 in Scotland, and 49 in Northern Ireland.

Notable British-Tunisians or Tunisians residing in the United Kingdom 

 Wafa Zaiane, journalist at the BBC Arabic Service, London  
 Hinda Hicks, singer
 Nadia Al Turki, TV journalist
 Hasna Kourda, Founder of British-Tunisian startup Save Your Wardrobe

See also
British Arabs
The Council for Arab-British Understanding
Tunisian diaspora
Tunisians in France
Tunisian people in Italy

References

External links 

 The British Tunisian Society, London 
 The Amanah Masjid (The Muath Trust), Birmingham
 Association Des Tunisiens Des Grandes Ecoles (ATUGE UK)
 Embassy of Tunisia, London

African diaspora in the United Kingdom
Tunisian diaspora